Carey Dean Moore (October 26, 1957 – August 14, 2018) was a convicted murderer, executed by lethal injection by the state of Nebraska. It was the first execution in Nebraska using lethal injection, and the state's first execution since 1997. The execution was the first in the United States to use fentanyl.

The execution took place on August 14, 2018, at the Nebraska State Penitentiary, where Moore had been on death row since his conviction for killing two cab drivers in 1979; Moore was one of the United States' longest-serving death row inmates.

The execution used a novel drug cocktail of diazepam, fentanyl, cisatracurium, and potassium chloride. The German manufacturer of two of the drugs, Fresenius Kabi, sued the state of Nebraska and sought a restraining order to halt the execution, because EU law prohibits German companies from supplying pharmaceuticals that are used for capital punishment, which is regarded as a grave violation of international human rights law in Germany and other European countries, and because the manufacturer asserted that Nebraska authorities had acquired the drugs by fraud and in violation of the distribution contract which expressly prohibits sale, resale or distribution to American prisons. The lawsuit was part of a wider backlash against American prisons for using drugs obtained from European manufacturers in violation of the laws of their countries of origin.

The execution was the fourth in Nebraska since the 1976 Gregg v. Georgia decision, the first by lethal injection, and the first since a 2015 effort to ban capital punishment in Nebraska. Three other prisoners, including John Joubert and Harold Otey were executed in Nebraska's electric chair in the 1990s.

Background 
In the summer of 1979, 21-year-old Carey Dean Moore robbed and murdered two cab drivers in Omaha, Nebraska. He later confessed to police, and was convicted in 1980 of two counts of first-degree murder. On June 20, 1980, a three-judge panel sentenced Moore to death.

Fresenius Kabi lawsuit 
The German pharmaceutical company Fresenius Kabi, the manufacturer of the drugs used in Moore's execution, filed a lawsuit in the United States, seeking a restraining order to stop the use of the drugs in question in the planned execution. Capital punishment has been abolished in all countries of the European Union and the EU requires that all EU companies not provide drugs for lethal injection. The absolute ban on the death penalty is enshrined in both the Charter of Fundamental Rights of the European Union (EU) and the European Convention on Human Rights, and the use of the death penalty is therefore regarded as a grave violation of international human rights law in Europe. Fresenius Kabi only sells the products in question with a legally binding clause that they may not be sold, resold or distributed to prisons or used in executions. Fresenius Kabi asserted that the drugs "could only have been obtained by defendants in contradiction and contravention of the distribution contracts the company has in place and therefore through improper or illegal means" and said the execution would cause reputational damage.

Nebraska denied the charge that it had acquired the drugs by "fraud, deceit or misrepresentation". The United States District Court for the District of Nebraska denied the company's motion for a temporary restraining order, whereby the court relied on the truthfulness of Nebraska Department of Correctional Services director Scott R. Frakes' testimony ("Unless Director Frazor is lying, it would seem that ...", p. 10). The court held that the company's position that delaying Moore's execution would not disrupt the public interest in Nebraska was "laughable" and that the company's position that the illegal use of its product in a killing violating the law of the country the company was based in would cause irreparable corporate reputational harm were without merit, stating that "this lawsuit has generated world-wide coverage of the Plaintiff's desire to avoid any association with the death penalty"  and therefore wouldn't be held accountable. The court further declared that the execution would be of major public interest: "In this case, it has everything to do with the functioning of democracy." The United States Court of Appeals for the Eighth Circuit affirmed the district court's decision in its entirety.

In a similar case, also in 2018, the pharmaceutical company Alvogen sought a restraining order to prevent Nevada's execution of Scott Dozier, alleging that the Nevada Department of Corrections had fraudulently acquired its drugs. The Fresenius and Alvogen lawsuits, which took place at the same time, were widely compared by commentators; both lawsuits are part of a trend whereby it has become increasingly difficult for United States authorities to legally buy drugs for the use in executions, due to widespread adoption of distribution contracts by pharmaceutical companies banning distribution to prisons and use in executions. Especially European pharmaceutical companies have pushed back against violations of the distribution contracts in the United States prohibiting straw buying by prisons for capital punishment.

In response to the lawsuit, Nebraska's prisons director Scott Frakes acknowledged that Nebraska would not be able to buy the drugs used in Moore's execution again. Frakes said he had been turned down by 40 pharmacies when trying to buy the drugs, due to the pharmacies' legal obligation not to sell the drugs to prisons.

See also 
 Scott Dozier
 List of most recent executions by jurisdiction
 List of people executed in Nebraska
 List of people executed in the United States in 2018

References

External links
 Carries Out Execution Carey Dean Moore

21st-century executions by Nebraska
21st-century executions of American people
2018 deaths
Capital punishment in the United States
Moore, Carey Dean
Illegal drug trade
People executed by Nebraska by lethal injection
Political controversies in the United States
Year of birth uncertain
1957 births
People executed for murder
American spree killers
Executed spree killers